Duvha Power Station in Mpumalanga, South Africa, is a coal-fired power plant operated by Eskom.

History
Construction of Duvha Power Station started in November 1975 and the last unit came into operation in 1984.

In 1993 Duvha became the first power station in the world to be retrofitted with pulse jet fabric filter plants on three of its six units. These plants contribute largely to the reduction of air pollution by removing 99.99% of the fly ash, which otherwise would be released into the air through the station's chimneys.

On 8 January 2003, Unit 2 generator exploded while being returned to service after a malfunction. On 9 February 2011 another unit failed catastrophically while performing over speed testing. The units are over speed rated at 3600 rpm and the last recorded speed before failure was 4250 rpm.

It was the first power station in South Africa to have a black power station manager, Ehud Matya.

Power generation
The station consists of six 600 MW units with a total installed capacity of 3,600 MW operating with a turbine efficiency of 37.6%.

The station is a twin sister to Tutuka Power Station.

Corruption allegations 
In April 2017 General Electric filed a court application accusing Eskom of rigging the tender to install a new boiler at the station so that Dongfang Electric would get the contact even though their bid was R1 billion (US$76 million) more than the General Electric bid.

See also 

 Fossil-fuel power plant
 List of power stations in South Africa

References

External links
 Duvha Power Station  on the Eskom-Website

Energy infrastructure completed in 1980
Towers completed in 1980
Energy infrastructure completed in 1984
Coal-fired power stations in South Africa
Towers in South Africa
Chimneys in South Africa
Buildings and structures in Mpumalanga
Economy of Mpumalanga
Emalahleni Local Municipality, Mpumalanga
20th-century architecture in South Africa